Long Lake Seaplane Base  is a privately owned, public use seaplane base on Long Lake in Aroostook County, Maine, United States. It is located at the Long Lake Sporting Club, three nautical miles (6 km) northeast of the central business district of Sinclair, Maine.

Facilities and aircraft 
Long Lake Seaplane Base has two seaplane landing areas on the water: 15/33 is 25,000 by 4,000 feet (7,620 x 1,219 m) and 7/25 is 15,800 by 2,640 feet (4,816 x 805 m). For the 12-month period ending August 13, 2009, the airport had 25 general aviation aircraft operations, an average of 2 per month.

See also 
 Long Lake Seaplane Base (Naples, Maine) at

References

External links 

 Aerial image as of May 1996 from USGS The National Map
 

Airports in Maine
Airports in Aroostook County, Maine
Seaplane bases in the United States